The Minister of Home Affairs (or simply, the Home Minister, ( Nepali: गृहमन्त्री ) is the head of the Ministry of Home Affairs of the Government of Nepal. One of the senior-most officers in the Federal Cabinet, the chief responsibility of the Home Minister is the maintenance of Nepal's internal security; the country's large police force comes under its jurisdiction. Occasionally, they are assisted by the Minister of State of Home Affairs and the lower-ranked Deputy Minister of Home Affairs.

List of Ministers of Home Affairs 

This is a list of former Ministers of Home Affairs since Nepal was declared Federal Democratic Republic of Nepal:

Reference

External links
 Official Website of Ministry of Home Affairs
Ministers of Internal Affairs by country
Lists of government ministers of Nepal